was a Japanese production designer, art director, and costume designer. Muraki joined Toho Film studio in 1944. He was nominated three times for the Academy Award for Best Art Direction for his work in the films Tora! Tora! Tora! (1970), Kagemusha (1980), and Ran (1985). He was also nominated for the Academy Award for Best Costume Design for his work in Yojimbo (1961). He is most well known for his collaborations with director Akira Kurosawa, having done work on all of Kurosawa's films from Record of a Living Being (1955) onward, with the exception of Dersu Uzala (1975).
He was married to Shinobu Muraki.

Award
 Medal with Purple Ribbon (1994)
 The Order of the Rising Sun 4th class. (1999)

References

External links

Japanese art directors
Japanese production designers
Japanese costume designers
1924 births
2009 deaths
Recipients of the Order of the Rising Sun, 4th class